William Paulding Jr. (March 7, 1770 – February 11, 1854) was a United States Representative from New York and the 56th and 58th Mayor of New York City. He was the Adjutant General of New York for two non-consecutive terms.

Early life
Paulding was born in Philipsburgh (now Tarrytown) in the Province of New York on March 7, 1770. He was the son of William Paulding Sr. (1735–1835) and the brother of Julia Paulding (wife of U.S. Representative William Irving) Catharine Paulding (wife of Mordecai Hale), and James Kirke Paulding, the United States Secretary of the Navy under President Martin Van Buren.  Paulding was a cousin of Revolutionary war hero John Paulding, one of the captors of Major John André.

Career
He completed preparatory studies, studied law, was admitted to the bar and commenced practice in New York.

He was elected as a Democratic-Republican to the Twelfth Congress, holding office from March 4, 1811, to March 3, 1813, and was a brigadier general of the New York militia. He served in the War of 1812 and was a delegate to the New York constitutional convention in 1821.

Paulding was Adjutant General of New York. From 1824 to 1826 he was Mayor of New York City.

Personal life
Paulding was married to Maria Rhinehander (1784–1851), and commissioned Lyndhurst near Tarrytown, the extant mansion designed by Alexander Jackson Davis, later owned by merchant George Merritt, and railroad tycoon Jay Gould. Together, they were the parents of:

 Frederick W. Paulding (1811–1858), the father of Julia Rhinelander Paulding who married Col. Richard Irving Dodge.

He died in Tarrytown on February 11, 1854. He was buried in the Paulding family vault at the Old Dutch Burying Ground in Sleepy Hollow, New York.

Legacy
Paulding Avenue in the Wakefield, Williamsbridge, and Morris Park sections of The Bronx is named after him.

References

External links

1770 births
1854 deaths
19th-century American lawyers
19th-century American politicians
People from Tarrytown, New York
New York (state) lawyers
American militiamen in the War of 1812
Mayors of New York City
Democratic-Republican Party members of the United States House of Representatives from New York (state)
Adjutants General of New York (state)
Brigadier generals
People from New York (state) in the War of 1812